The Shanghai Story is a 1954 American film noir crime film directed by Frank Lloyd and starring Ruth Roman, Edmond O'Brien and Richard Jaeckel. It was based on a novel by Lester Yard. The film's sets were designed by the art director William Flannery. It was produced and distributed by Republic Pictures as one of the company's more prestigious releases.

Plot
A number of people are held captive by Major Ling Wu and his men, who refuse to let anyone go until identifying a spy in their midst. When he sends his assassin Sun Lee after one of the hostages, Dan Maynard, a doctor, and Knuckles Greer, a sailor, manage to intervene.

Dan is confounded by the beautiful Rita King's seeming ability to come and go as she pleases. It becomes obvious that the police chief Colonel Zorek considers himself her protector.

Ling is so determined to frighten the captives into exposing the spy that he kills his own man, Su, just to prove how far he is prepared to go. Ling tries to rape a young newlywed, Leah De Verno, and cuts the rations so that the captives have barely enough food to stay alive. Some are killed or mysteriously led away.

Zorek propositions Rita if she will cooperate. Dan still doesn't know that she is being held against her will, just like everyone else. A young girl named Penny, daughter of another interned couple, requires emergency medical help and Dan appeals to his captors to permit him to operate on the child. The only way permission is granted is for Rita to grant Zorek her favors.

A captive named Paul Grant is discovered to have a hidden radio. He has received a coded message that a rescue submarine will be waiting nearby. Dan helps him attempt an escape, but before he leaves, Grant shares with Dan the coded information, just in case.

Grant is reported dead. Dan places the blame on Rita, presuming she tipped off Zorek how to capture and kill the spy. Zorek, summoned and assuming he will be rewarded, is instead punished for permitting the escape. Dan finally becomes aware that Rita played no role in assisting their captors, and after he escapes and contacts the submarine, he goes back to rescue the others and her.

Cast

References

Bibliography
 Goble, Alan. The Complete Index to Literary Sources in Film. Walter de Gruyter, 1999.

External links

1954 films
American crime thriller films
1950s crime thriller films
1950s English-language films
Films directed by Frank Lloyd
Republic Pictures films
Films based on American novels
Films set in Shanghai
American black-and-white films
1950s American films